Kalateh-ye Gows ol Din (also Romanized as Kalāteh-ye Gows ol Dīn; also known as Kalāteh-ye Qows od Dīn and Kalāteh-ye ʿAbd ol Raḥman) is a village in Salehabad Rural District, Salehabad County, Razavi Khorasan Province, Iran. At the 2006 census, its population was 76, in 16 families.

References 

Populated places in   Torbat-e Jam County